This is a list of 101 species in the genus Nysius, false chinch bugs.

Nysius species

 Nysius aa Polhemus, 1998
 Nysius abnormis Usinger, 1942
 Nysius albipennis Distant, 1913
 Nysius angustatus Uhler, 1872
 Nysius angustellus (Blanchard, 1852)
 Nysius atlantidum Horvath, 1890
 Nysius baeckstroemi Bergroth, 1923
 Nysius beardsleyi Ashlock, 1966
 Nysius blackburni White, 1881
 Nysius caledoniae Distant, 1920
 Nysius cargadosensis Distant, 1909
 Nysius ceylanicus (Motschulsky, 1863)
 Nysius chenopodii Usinger, 1942
 Nysius coenosulus Stal, 1859
 Nysius communis Usinger, 1942
 Nysius contiguus Walker, 1872
 Nysius convexus (Usinger, 1942)
 Nysius cymoides (Spinola, 1837)
 Nysius dallasi White, 1878
 Nysius delectulus Perkins, 1912
 Nysius delectus White, 1878
 Nysius dohertyi Distant, 1904
 Nysius ephippiatus (Spinola, 1852)
 Nysius ericae (Schilling, 1829)
 Nysius erythynus Fernando, 1960
 Nysius euphorbiae Horvath, 1910
 Nysius eximius Stal, 1858
 Nysius expressus Distant, 1883
 Nysius femoratus Van Duzee, 1940
 Nysius feuerborni China, 1935
 Nysius frigatensis Usinger, 1942
 Nysius fucatus Usinger, 1942
 Nysius fullawayi Usinger, 1942
 Nysius fuscovittatus Barber, 1958
 Nysius gloriae Baena & Garcia, 1999
 Nysius graminicola (Kolenati, 1845)
 Nysius grandis Baker, 1906
 Nysius groenlandicus (Zetterstedt, 1840)
 Nysius haeckeli (Leon *, 1890)
 Nysius hardyi Ashlock, 1966
 Nysius helveticus (Herrich-Schaeffer, 1850)
 Nysius hidakai Nakatani, 2015
 Nysius huttoni White, 1878  (wheat bug)
 Nysius immunis (Walker, 1872)
 Nysius inconspicuus Distant, 1904
 Nysius insoletus Barber, 1947
 Nysius irroratus (Spinola, 1852)
 Nysius kinbergi Usinger, 1959
 Nysius lacustrinus Distant, 1909
 Nysius lichenicola Kirkaldy, 1910
 Nysius liliputanus Eyles & Ashlock, 1969
 Nysius longicollis Blackburn, 1889
 Nysius melanicus Distant, 1909
 Nysius minor Distant, 1909
 Nysius mixtus Usinger, 1942
 Nysius monticola Distant, 1893
 Nysius neckerensis Usinger, 1942
 Nysius nemorivagus White, 1881
 Nysius niger Baker, 1906  (northern false chinch bug)
 Nysius nigricornis Kerzhner, 1979
 Nysius nihoae Usinger, 1942
 Nysius nubilus Dallas, 1852
 Nysius oceanicus Usinger, 1937
 Nysius orarius Malipatil, 2005
 Nysius pallipennis Walker, 1872
 Nysius palor Ashlock, 1963
 Nysius paludicola Barber, 1949
 Nysius picipes Usinger, 1937
 Nysius pilosulus Horvath, 1904
 Nysius plebeius Distant, 1883
 Nysius procerus Distant, 1893
 Nysius puberulus Berg, 1895
 Nysius pulchellus Stal, 1859
 Nysius punctipes Stal, 1856
 Nysius raphanus Howard, 1872  (false chinch bug)
 Nysius rhyparus Stal, 1859
 Nysius rubescens White, 1881
 Nysius salti Usinger, 1952
 Nysius sanctaehelenae White, 1877
 Nysius scutellatus Dallas, 1852
 Nysius senecionis (Schilling, 1829)
 Nysius simulans Stal, 1859
 Nysius spectabilis Distant, 1901
 Nysius steeleae China, 1934
 Nysius subcinctus Walker, 1872
 Nysius sublittoralis Perkins, 1912
 Nysius suffusus Usinger, 1942
 Nysius tasmaniensis Malipatil, 2005
 Nysius tenellus Barber, 1947
 Nysius terrestris Usinger, 1942
 Nysius thymi (Wolff, 1804)
 Nysius transcaspicus Wagner, 1958
 Nysius usitatus Ashlock, 1972
 Nysius vinitor Bergroth, 1891  (rutherglen bug)
 Nysius vulcanorum Lindberg, 1958
 Nysius wekiuicola Ashlock & Gagne, 1983
 † Nysius stratus Scudder, 1890
 † Nysius terrae Scudder, 1890
 † Nysius tritus Scudder, 1890
 † Nysius vecula Scudder, 1890
 † Nysius vinctus Scudder, 1890

References

L
Nysius